European United Left can refer to one of three political groups in the European Parliament:

European United Left–Nordic Green Left
European United Left (1989–93)
European United Left (1994–95)

See also
 Political groups of the European Parliament